The Gooniyandi, also known as the Konejandi, are an Aboriginal Australian people in the Kimberley region of Western Australia.

Language
Gooniyandi with Bunuba is one of the two languages of the Bunuban language family.

Country
Their heartland lay north around the limestone enclaves of the Wunaamin Miliwundi Ranges and around Stony river. Norman Tindale states that their territory encompassed also Bohemia Down, the Ramsay, Sandstone, Mueller, Burramundy, and Geikie Ranges.

According to their tradition, they also had a native purchase on the plains on the northern side of Christmas Creek before the advent of whites, but had lost this area to the Walmadjari.

Social organization
Gooniyandi society is divided into 8 subsections (gooroo), each divided into male and female classes.
 (M) jawalyi A1 = B1 jagadda
(F) nyawajaddi A1= B1 nagadda
 (M) jawangari A2 = B2 jambiyindi
(F) nawangari A2 = B2 nambiyandi
 (M) joowooddoo CI =DI jawandi
(F) nyawooddoo CI =D1 nyawana
 (M) jangala C2 = D2 joonggoodda
(F) nangala C2 = D2 nyanyjili

Ecology and economy
The Gooniyandi comprised numweouas inland foraging bands, each harvesting the rich resources, of reptiles, crustaceans and fish to be found along their water courses. They had three distinct terms for the types of territory their land covered. Though basically riverine dwellers, shifting around pools, springs and rivers in what they called walibiri lands (river country), they also ventured over pindiri or plains of scrub-land (ti:winji) and forested zones (ke'rede (trees)) to hunt for kangaroos. A third term was ka:waro, denoting the mountainous areas where the euro could be found. Labour was gendered, with men hunting game, which included bustards, echidnas and emu, while the women gathered vegetables, honey and such protein foodstuffs as witchetty grubs and frogs.

The Fitzroy Crossing Gooniyandi were ideally placed to be intermediaries in northwest trade, which they called tjirdi or wirnandi. The crossing was a strategic transit point for trading goods that were passed on over vast distances. They would exchange with southern tribes manufactured goods from the northwest and east like tjimbila, bifaced pressure-flaked stone knives for rites like circumcision and also used for spear blades.

Shellware collected by the Djaui of the Sunday Islands, and bartered with the Warwa and Nyigina in exchange for spears, would in turn be traded by these tribes to the Bunuba and Gooniyandi, who called them tjakuli. These tjakuli trade goods were used in exchanges with the Gija people and the Djaru. Many such objects from the Djaui would eventually end up among the Western Desert tribes.

History of contact
After Alexander Forrest had, in 1879, surveyed Gooniyandi lands, and wrote a glowing account of their potential for development, they began to be selected for pastoral leases in the late 1880s, when pastoralists began to "open up" the Fitzroy River area to establish cattle and sheep stations.

Alternative names
 Gunian, Gunan
 Konean, Konajan, Konejanu. (Mangala exonym)
 Kuniandu, Kunian, Kunan, Goonien
 Wadeawulu. (Gija exonym)

Source:

Notable people
 Nyibayarri. (Jack Bohemia), a Kimberley police tracker, fluent in several languages, who was awarded the British Empire Medal in 1970 after 32 years service.

Notes

Citations

Sources

Aboriginal peoples of Western Australia